Juan José may refer to:
 Juan José (given name)
 Juan José (play), an 1895 play by Joaquín Dicenta
 Juan José (telenovela), a 1964 Mexican telenovela
 Juan José (footballer, born 1957), Spanish footballer

See also